Najtentulus is a genus of proturans in the family Acerentomidae.

Species
 Najtentulus silvestris Szeptycki & Weiner, 1997

References

Protura